Craig Anthony Washington (born October 12, 1941) is an American lawyer and Democratic Party politician from Texas who served in the Texas State Senate and the United States House of Representatives.

The son of Roy and Azalia Washington, Washington graduated from Prairie View A&M University in 1966 and was originally interested in becoming a doctor, but as admissions to medical school had already ceased, Washington decided to instead apply at Texas Southern University's law school.

Career
In 1972, the state of Texas began electing members of the state House of Representatives and State Senate, for the first time, by single-member districts. Washington, along with four other minority candidates, Anthony Hall, George T. "Mickey" Leland, Benny Reyes and Cecil Bush, (dubbed the "People's Five"), ran for seats in the Texas House of Representatives. Washington was elected, and represented District 86 in the state House from 1973 to 1982. He then represented District 13 in the state senate from 1983 until 1989.

Washington was elected as a Democrat to the 101st United States Congress for Texas's 18th congressional district, by special election, December 9, 1989, to fill the vacancy caused by the death of Mickey Leland. He was reelected to the 102nd United States Congress and 103rd United States Congress and served from December 9, 1989, to January 3, 1995. He took stands against some projects, like the International Space Station, where spending would have flowed to his district.

In March, 1994, Washington was routed in the Democratic primary by Houston City Councilwoman Sheila Jackson Lee, winning only 36.5 percent of the vote.  Lee won in November and still holds the seat today.

Since leaving Congress, Washington has practiced law in Houston and Bastrop, Texas.

See also 
 List of African-American United States representatives

References

External links

1941 births
Living people
Democratic Party members of the Texas House of Representatives
People from Longview, Texas
Democratic Party Texas state senators
African-American members of the United States House of Representatives
African-American state legislators in Texas
People from Houston
Texas Southern University alumni
Prairie View A&M University alumni
Thurgood Marshall School of Law alumni
Texas lawyers
Democratic Party members of the United States House of Representatives from Texas
21st-century African-American people
20th-century African-American people